Christina von Braun (born 27 June 1944 in Rome) is a German sociologist, gender theorist, author and filmmaker. She is professor emeritus at Humboldt University. In 2013 she was honored with the Sigmund Freud Culture Prize of the German Psychoanalytic Association (DPV) and the German Psychoanalytic Society (DPG) for her work as a scientist.

Life 
Christina von Braun is the daughter of Hildegard Beck-Margis and Sigismund von Braun. Her uncle was rocket scientist Wernher von Braun. Her sister is the FDP politician Carola von Braun. Her grandmother, Hildegard Margis died in the Barnimstraße women's prison after being arrested for her resistance against National Socialism in connection with the group around Anton Saefkow and Franz Jacob.

Christina von Braun spent her early years in the Vatican and only came to Germany in 1949.  She studied at boarding schools in England and Germany. She studied Political Science and Sociology at New York University. She wrote her master's thesis at the University of Bonn on "The role of public relations in international relations".  From 1969 to 1981, she was a freelance writer and filmmaker, based in Paris. She produced films about the bestseller Coincidence and Necessity by the molecular biologist Jacques Monod, the life story of the writer André Malraux (BR 1972), a conversation with Claude Lévi-Strauss (SR 1972), Gustave Flaubert's novel Madame Bovary (SR 1976), the Paris urban planning of the prefect Georges-Eugène Haussmann (WDR 1979), the artist Meret Oppenheim (NDR 1977) and the city of Bron (BR 1979).

In 1981, she moved with her husband and their two children to Bonn.

From 1991 to 1993, she was a fellow at the Institute for Advanced Study in the Humanities in Essen. She was visiting professor at Northwestern University, and Dartmouth College.

In 1994 she was appointed to the chair of cultural theory with a focus on gender and history at the Institute for Cultural Studies at the Humboldt University. Her main areas of research and teaching include: gender, media, religion and modernity, secularization, and the history of anti-Semitism .

Christina von Braun has produced about fifty film documentaries and television plays on cultural and historical themes and has written numerous books and essays on the interrelationship between mental history and physical history.

Personal life 

Christina von Braun is married to the psychoanalyst and professor emeritus of psychiatry Tilo Held. They have been living together in Berlin since 2001. They have two children.

Works 
 Geschlecht. Eine persönliche und eine politische Geschichte. Propyläen, Berlin 2021, .
 Blutsbande. Verwandtschaft als Kulturgeschichte. Aufbau, Berlin 2018. .
 Wachstum im Wandel: Chancen und Risiken für die Zukunft der Sozialen Marktwirtschaft, herausgegeben von Bertelsmann Stiftung, Beiträge von Christina von Braun und 11 andere, Fotografien von Veit Mette, Bertelsmann Stiftung, Gütersloh 2016, .
 Der Preis des Geldes. Eine Kulturgeschichte. Aufbau, Berlin 2012, .
 Verschleierte Wirklichkeit. Die Frau, der Islam und der Westen. Aufbau-Verlag, Berlin 2007,  (with Bettina Mathes).
 Stille Post. Eine andere Familiengeschichte. Propyläen, Berlin 2007, ; Taschenbuchausgabe: List-Taschenbuch 60810, Berlin 2008, 
 Gibt es eine „jüdische“ und eine „christliche“ Sexualwissenschaft? Sexualität und Säkularisierung (= Wiener Vorlesungen im Rathaus, Band 110). Picus, Wien 2004, .
 Interface 5 – Die Politik der Maschine. Computer Odyssee 2001. Nomos, Hamburg 2002,  (with Hartmut Böhme, Martin Burckhardt, Wolfgang Coy, Friedrich Kittler und Hans-Ulrich Reck).
 Versuch über den Schwindel. Religion, Schrift, Bild, Geschlecht. Pendo, Zürich 2001, .
 Essen und Gesellschaft. Die Politik der Ernährung (= Senatsarbeitskreis für Wissenschaft und Verantwortlichkeit; Band 5). Studienverlag, Innsbruck / Wien / München 2000,  (with Eva Barlösius).
 Die schamlose Schönheit des Vergangenen. Zum Verhältnis von Geschlecht und Geschichte, Aufsätze. Verlag Neue Kritik, Frankfurt am Main 1989, 
 Nicht ich. Logik, Lüge, Libido. Neue Kritik, Frankfurt am Main 1985, ; Neuausgabe, Aufbau Verlag, Berlin 2009,

Further reading 
 Christina von Braun: Gender. A personal and a political story. Propylaea, Berlin 2021,

References

External links 
 http://christinavonbraun.de/
 Jüdische Matrilinearität – Christliche Patrilinearität (RGS S01/E01) Freie Universität Berlin

1944 births

Living people

German social scientists